The White Sands V-2 Launching Site, also known as Launch Complex 33 and originally as Army Launch Area Number 1, is an historic rocket launch complex at White Sands Missile Range in southern New Mexico.  It was here that the United States first performed test launches of German V-2 rockets captured toward the end of World War II.  These tests were the first step in both military advances in rocketry, and in the development of the United States space exploration programs.  The site was designated a National Historic Landmark in 1985.

History
The Nazi German V-2 rocket was one of the most advanced weapons produced in World War II, and hundreds of them were launched at Allied targets in the last two years of the war.  In the aftermath of the war, the United States launched Operation Paperclip, a secret program that successfully recruited German scientists and engineers (most prominently Wernher von Braun) to work for the American military, and transported 100 captured V-2 rockets to the recently established White Sands Missile Range.  Between 1946 and 1951, the Army fired 67 V-2 sounding rockets from this site.  These launches, and the training of a class of scientists and engineers, led directly to the further development of new rocket launch programs, including ultimately the launch of humans into space.

Site description
Launch Complex 33 is located near the far southern end of the White Sands Missile Range, east of Las Cruces, New Mexico. There are two principal surviving elements of the launch complex. It has four platforms at different heights, which can be swung into position to accommodate rockets of different sizes, and a network of block-and-tackle systems to assist in rocket placement. It has observation portals with specialized glass windows allowing for close observation of the launches.

See also

National Register of Historic Places listings in Doña Ana County, New Mexico
List of National Historic Landmarks in New Mexico

References

Buildings and structures in Doña Ana County, New Mexico
Historic American Engineering Record in New Mexico
Infrastructure completed in 1946
Military facilities on the National Register of Historic Places in New Mexico
Military history of New Mexico
National Historic Landmarks in New Mexico
National Register of Historic Places in Doña Ana County, New Mexico
Rocket launch sites in the United States
White Sands Missile Range
1946 establishments in New Mexico